Spicy Horse was a Shanghai-based independent video game developer started by American McGee, Anthony Jacobson, and Adam Lang in 2007. It was announced on July 23, 2016 that the company is closing its doors to focus on smaller indie development. The studio is best known for Alice: Madness Returns, the sequel to American McGee's Alice.

History
After shutting his then-company The Mauretania Import Export Company, American McGee flew to Asia to seek business opportunities. From there, he met a pool of talented people in China who have been working and outsourcing games for western developers for many years but did not have any creative control over the IPs. American saw this as a favourable circumstance and decided to form a company in Shanghai to not only provide job opportunities to local talents but to also offer a healthy work environment.

The studio was established in 2007. It was called a studio "leading the way" in episodic games.  It was the largest independent Western developer in China.

Spicy Horse employed more than 70 people at their studio in Zhabei District, Shanghai. The company's development process utilized a "core team" methodology and 100% outsourced art asset production to conserve energy directed at the core competencies of game development.

Following rumors regarding the studio's closure, on March 29, 2016 McGee acknowledged that there had been some layoffs but they will continue to operate and will look to move away from F2P mobile games in the future.

In 2016, McGee announced the closure of Spicy Horse after 10 years of development. He plans to focus on indie development using Patreon and work on a different work environment like his sailboat.

Products
Their first title, American McGee's Grimm, was released on GameTap in July 2008 in an episodic form and ran through March 2009. It was built using Epic's Unreal Engine 3.

Spicy Horse developed the sequel to American McGee's Alice for Electronic Arts, titled Alice: Madness Returns. It is the first console game entirely designed and developed in China for export.

Spicy Horse spawned a childcompany, Spicy Pony, for creating digital mobile media games for the iPhone. Their first title, DexIQ was released in early December 2009. Their second was a Little Red Riding Hood adaption for the iPad called
Akaneiro. Their next project was to be an adaptation of The Wizard of Oz, OZombie, financed by a Kickstarter campaign. The campaign was cancelled on July 14, 2013 in order to focus on a series of Alice short films and due to lack of support for the OZombie project.

References

External links
Spicy Horse Games official site

Companies based in Shanghai
Chinese companies established in 2007
Chinese companies disestablished in 2016
Privately held companies of China
Video game development companies
Video game companies established in 2007
Video game companies disestablished in 2016
Defunct video game companies of China